Lance Daniel Broadway (born August 20, 1983) is an American actor and former Major League Baseball pitcher. He is 6'3" and throws right-handed.

High school and college
Broadway was born in Bryan, Texas, and attended Grand Prairie High School, where he was an all-district performer all three of his years on the varsity team. He transferred from Grand Prairie after his junior year and attended Waxahachie High.  He played with former high-school All-State player Ben Hudspeth.

Broadway then went on to pitch for Dallas Baptist University, and major in communications, where he earned all-conference honors both years he pitched for the Patriots. He threw two no-hitters as a freshman and as a sophomore went 10–2 with a 2.82 Earned run average and 102 strikeouts in 108 innings pitched.

After two seasons with Dallas Baptist, Broadway transferred to Texas Christian University.  He went 15–1 with a 1.62 ERA and 151 strikeouts in 117 innings pitched.  He was named to the All-Tournament Team of the 2005 Conference USA Tournament and also the conference's Pitcher of the Year and Male Athlete of the Year.

Minor leagues

Broadway was selected 15th overall (the fourth pitcher taken in the first round) by the Chicago White Sox in the 2005 Major League Baseball Draft. He signed for $1.57 million.  After being selected, Broadway went 1–3 with a 4.58 ERA in 11 starts for the Single-A Winston-Salem Warthogs of the Carolina League. He went into the  season considered the eighth best prospect in the White Sox system, and combined to go 8–8 with a 2.75 ERA and 117 strikeouts in 26 starts and 160.1 innings pitched between the Double-A Birmingham Barons and Triple-A Charlotte Knights.

Entering , Broadway was named the third-best prospect in the White Sox system. Broadway finished the season at 8–9 with a 4.65 ERA and 108 strikeouts in 26 starts and 155 innings pitched for Charlotte.

New York Mets
The White Sox, with a surplus of starting pitching, and realizing that Broadway was unlikely to crack the team's rotation saw an opportunity to acquire a veteran backup catcher. The Sox traded Broadway to the Mets for Ramón Castro in May . Broadway, who was 0–1 with a 5.06 ERA for the season, was assigned to the Triple-A Buffalo Bisons of the International League and was added to the starting rotation.

On August 26, 2009, Broadway was called up to the New York Mets when LHP Óliver Pérez was placed on the disabled list.

On December 13, 2009, Broadway was non-tendered by the New York Mets, making him a free agent.

Toronto Blue Jays
On December 16, 2009, Broadway was signed by the Toronto Blue Jays to a minor league deal. He spent the entire season with the Triple-A Las Vegas 51s, going 3–11 with a 7.66 ERA in 29 games (20 starts).

Legal and personal problems
At a nightclub in 2010, Broadway allegedly assaulted Ivan Pinney, severely damaging his eye and face.

Acting career
Broadway made his motion picture debut in the 2013 film Olympus Has Fallen.

In 2014, Broadway was cast as "Commander Linden" in Sci Fi thriller Teleios, which was later renamed Beyond the Trek and released in 2017 by Screen Media Films.

In 2015, Broadway was cast as Devon in the short film Shattered Reflections.

References

External links

1983 births
Living people
Baseball players from Texas
Birmingham Barons players
Buffalo Bisons (minor league) players
Charlotte Knights players
Chicago White Sox players
Dallas Baptist Patriots baseball players
Las Vegas 51s players
Leones del Caracas players
American expatriate baseball players in Venezuela
Major League Baseball pitchers
New York Mets players
People from Bryan, Texas
Texas Christian University alumni
TCU Horned Frogs baseball players
Winston-Salem Warthogs players
All-American college baseball players
Wisconsin Woodchucks players